Metallica: Through the Never is a soundtrack album for the film of the same name, consisting of live recordings by American heavy metal band Metallica. It was released on September 24, 2013, via Blackened Recordings and has charted in several countries.

All tracks on the soundtrack are live recordings from their Canadian shows at Rexall Place in Edmonton, Alberta, on August 17 and 18, 2012, and Rogers Arena in Vancouver, British Columbia, on August 24, 25 and 27, 2012, with the exception of "Orion", which was recorded live at soundcheck.

Track listing

Metallica
 James Hetfield – vocals, rhythm guitar, guitar solo on "Master Of Puppets" & "Nothing Else Matters"
 Kirk Hammett – lead guitar
 Robert Trujillo – bass
 Lars Ulrich – drums

Charts and certifications

Weekly charts

Year-end charts

Certifications

Personnel
 James Hetfield – lead vocals, rhythm guitar
 Kirk Hammett – lead guitar, backing vocals
 Robert Trujillo – bass, backing vocals
 Lars Ulrich – drums

References

External links
 

2013 live albums
2013 soundtrack albums
Metallica live albums
Thriller film soundtracks
Heavy metal soundtracks
Metallica soundtracks
Self-released albums